is a 1979 Japanese experimental film by Toshio Matsumoto. The music was composed by Joji Yuasa.

Summary 
A mesmerizing trip through the psychedelic vastness of space.

External links 
 

Psychedelic films
1970s Japanese films